The 2021 Cook Out Southern 500, the 72nd running of the event,   was a NASCAR Cup Series race held on September 5, 2021 at Darlington Raceway in Darlington, South Carolina. Contested over 367 laps on the  egg-shaped oval, it was the 27th race of the 2021 NASCAR Cup Series season, first race of the Playoffs, and the first race of the Round of 16. Denny Hamlin took his first victory of the season and clinched a spot in the round of 12.

Report

Background

Darlington Raceway is a race track built for NASCAR racing located near Darlington, South Carolina. It is nicknamed "The Lady in Black" and "The Track Too Tough to Tame" by many NASCAR fans and drivers and advertised as "A NASCAR Tradition." It is of a unique, somewhat egg-shaped design, an oval with the ends of very different configurations, a condition which supposedly arose from the proximity of one end of the track to a minnow pond the owner refused to relocate. This situation makes it very challenging for the crews to set up their cars' handling in a way that is effective at both ends.

Surface Issues
Darlington Raceway was last repaved following the May 2007 meeting (from 2005 to 2019, there was only one meeting;  the second meeting was reinstated in 2020), and from 2008 to 2019, there was one night race.  In 2020, a day race returned to the schedule, and instead of two races (one Xfinity and one Cup) during the entire year, the track hosted six races (three Cup, two Xfinity, and one Truck).  The circuit kept repairing the circuit with patches during each summer before the annual Cup race in September.  The circuit's narrow Turn 2 rapidly deteriorated with cracks in the tarmac allowing water to seep in the circuit.  In July 2021, the circuit repaved a six hundred foot section at the entrance of Turn 2 and ending at the exit of the turn to repair the tarmac and resolve the issue for safety and to reduce the threat of weepers and surface issues in that section of the circuit.

Entry list
 (R) denotes rookie driver.
 (i) denotes driver who are ineligible for series driver points.

Qualifying
Ryan Blaney was awarded the pole for the race as determined by competition-based formula.

Starting Lineup

Race

Ryan Blaney started the race from the pole position. Early in the race, playoff driver Alex Bowman scraped the wall while playoff driver Michael McDowell was taken out of the race after hitting the wall. Denny Hamlin won the first stage of the race. In the second stage, Austin Dillon and playoff driver Kyle Busch made contact, with Busch hitting the wall and going to the garage, ending his night. Kyle Larson won the second stage of the race. Several other playoff drivers had trouble during the race including William Byron, who hit the wall after cutting a tire, Chase Elliott, who hit the wall after going three-wide with Bubba Wallace and Christopher Bell, and Blaney, who spun late in the race. In the closing laps, Hamlin was leading Larson. On the final lap, Larson tapped Hamlin, but Hamlin blocked the top line to win the race, his first win of the season, to move on to the next round of the playoffs.

Stage Results

Stage One
Laps: 115

Stage Two
Laps: 115

Final Stage Results

Stage Three
Laps: 137

Race statistics
 Lead changes: 18 among 10 different drivers
 Cautions/Laps: 11 for 52
 Red flags: 0
 Time of race: 4 hours, 8 minutes and 1 second
 Average speed:

Media

Television
NBC Sports covered the race on the television side. Rick Allen, two–time Darlington winner Jeff Burton, Steve Letarte and Dale Earnhardt Jr. called Stages 1 and 3 of the race from the broadcast booth. Earnhardt Jr., Dale Jarrett and Kyle Petty called Stage 2 of the race from the broadcast booth. Dave Burns, Parker Kligerman and Marty Snider handled the pit road duties from pit lane.

Radio
MRN had the radio call for the race, which was also simulcast on Sirius XM NASCAR Radio.

Standings after the race

Drivers' Championship standings

Manufacturers' Championship standings

Note: Only the first 16 positions are included for the driver standings.

References

2021 NASCAR Cup Series
NASCAR races at Darlington Raceway
September 2021 sports events in the United States
2021 in sports in South Carolina